Stafford–Olive Historic District is a national historic district located at Washington, Franklin County, Missouri. The district encompasses 140 contributing buildings in a predominantly residential section of Washington. The district developed between about 1858 and 1949, and includes representative examples of Queen Anne, Second Empire, Tudor Revival, Colonial Revival, and Bungalow / American Craftsman style residential architecture.  Notable buildings include the Jos. Rumme House (c. 1865), Chas Haupt House (c. 1875), Louis Horn House (c. 1858), F. R. Pelster House (c. 1865), Hydecker House (c. 1858), Stephen Filla House (c. 1909), Chas. Kopp House (c. 1930), Hy. Thias Honse (c. 1855), and William Pace House (1929).

It was listed on the National Register of Historic Places in 2000.

References

Historic districts on the National Register of Historic Places in Missouri
Queen Anne architecture in Missouri
Second Empire architecture in Missouri
Tudor Revival architecture in Missouri
Colonial Revival architecture in Missouri
Bungalow architecture in Missouri
Buildings and structures in Franklin County, Missouri
National Register of Historic Places in Franklin County, Missouri